Sarang Community Church of Southern California is a Presbyterian Church in America (PCA) Korean-American church located in Anaheim, California. Sarang has more than 10,000 church attenders. Some statistics estimate about 11,000 members.  It is the largest Korean church outside of Korea (Republic of), as well as the largest Asian church outside Asia. In addition, Sarang is the largest congregation within the Presbyterian Church in America. "Sarang" (사랑) is Korean for "love."

Sa-Rang Community Church was founded in 1988 by Rev. Oh Jung-hyun.

In 2003 Pastor Oh accepted his call to a megachurch in Seoul, Korea of the same name, Sarang Community Church. In 2004, Rev. SeungWook Kim (Daniel Kim) was called from Korean United Church, (PCA) and installed as the new pastor.

In 2011, Pastor Kim accepted his call to pastor a church in Korea called Hallelujah Community Church. In 2012, Rev. ChangSoo Roh was called from Korean Central Presbyterian Church, (PCA) and installed as the new pastor.

References

External links
 Church Webpage in Korean
 Church Webpage in English
 Church Webpage for mobile devices

Presbyterian Church in America churches in California
Presbyterian megachurches in the United States
Megachurches in California
Churches in Orange County, California
Korean-American culture in California